The Ó Gadhra Chiefs of the Name were the head of the Clan O'Gara, who were originally located in Sliabh Lugha (formerly known as Gailenga), the southern part of the territory ruled by the Kings of Luighne Connacht. In the 13th century they were expelled from the area and moved to Cul Ui Fionn, later known as the barony of Coolavin, County Sligo. 

The first to bear the surname was Ruaidrí Ua Gadhra, rígdomna of Luigne, who died in 1059.

Chiefs list
 Ruaidri Ó Gadhra, died 1285.
 Brian Ó Gadhra, died 1325.
 Donough Roe Ó Gadhra, died 1328.
 Diarmaid Ó Gadhra, alive 1328.
 Ó Gadhra

See also
 Kings of Luighne Connacht
 Kings of Sliabh Lugha

References
 The History of Mayo, Hubert T. Knox, p. 379, 1908.
 Leabhar na nGenealach:The Great Book of Irish Genealogies, Dubhaltach Mac Fhirbhisigh (died 1671), eag. Nollaig Ó Muraíle, 2004–05, De Burca, Dublin.

External links
 http://www.ucc.ie/celt/published/T100005C/
 http://www.ogara.org/Traynor.html

Gaelic-Irish nations and dynasties